Benjamin Samuel Kofi Kwakye is a former Ghanaian police officer and was the Inspector General of Police of the Ghana Police Service from 17 July 1978 to 4 June 1979.

References

Year of birth missing
Possibly living people
Ghanaian police officers
Ghanaian Inspector Generals of Police